Woodstock is a small settlement in the Tasman District of the northern South Island of New Zealand. It is located on the Motueka Valley Highway, close to the eastern bank of the Motueka River, some 20 kilometres southwest of Motueka, at the junction of the Motueka River and its small tributary, the Dove River.

References

Populated places in the Tasman District